Season 2003–04 was a disappointment for Hibernian, as the team again finished in the bottom half of the Scottish Premier League, and was knocked out at the first stage of the Scottish Cup. The main highlight of the season was the run to the 2004 Scottish League Cup Final, which Hibs reached by defeating both halves of the Old Firm. This also ended in disappointment, however, as the Final was lost 2–0 to Livingston. A month after that defeat, manager Bobby Williamson was allowed to leave the club to manage Plymouth Argyle.

League season 
With the Hibs squad "stretched to its limits" by injuries to Ian Murray, Grant Brebner, Stephen Glass and Yannick Zambernardi, Hibs again struggled in the league. Financial problems meant that the club had sold or released many of its senior players during Bobby Williamson's time in charge, and even Williamson's own long-term contract was renegotiated to a shorter term and lower salary. The Hibs board were also apparently willing to allow Plymouth Argyle to take Williamson when made an approach in April 2004. Williamson's assistants, Gerry McCabe and Jim Clark, took charge of the team for the remainder of the season, with Tony Mowbray appointed soon after its conclusion.

Results

Final table

Scottish League Cup 
As one of the SPL clubs who had not automatically qualified for European competition, Hibs entered at the last 32 stage (second round) of the competition, in which they defeated Montrose 9–0 at Easter Road. Hibs were then given another home draw in the last 16, against Queen of the South, which Hibs won 2–1. In the quarter-final, Hibs were again drawn to play at home, but this time had to face league leaders Celtic. Despite falling behind early in the second half, Hibs won 2–1 thanks to a late goal by Kevin Thomson. Hibs were then given another tough draw for the semi-final, playing the other half of the Old Firm, Rangers. Nonetheless, Hibs won the tie 4–3 on penalties, with Frank de Boer's miss sending Hibs through. These two upset victories sent Hibs to the Final, where they met Livingston. Hibs sold a remarkable 37,000 tickets for the game, suggesting that the club still had the drawing power to be a major force in Scottish football. The match ended in major disappointment, however, as Livingston won 2–0 to lift the trophy.

Results

Scottish Cup

Results

Transfers

Players In

Players Out

Loans In

Loans Out

Player stats 

During the 2003–04 season, Hibs used 27 different players in competitive games. The table below shows the number of appearances and goals scored by each player. Goalkeeper Daniel Andersson was the only player to appear in every match, playing in 38 SPL matches, five League Cup ties and the one Scottish Cup tie.

|}

See also
List of Hibernian F.C. seasons

Notes

External links 
Fixtures & Results, Hibernian F.C. official site
Hibernian 2003/2004 results and fixtures, Soccerbase

Hibernian F.C. seasons
Hibernian